EPH receptor A2 (ephrin type-A receptor 2) is a protein that in humans is encoded by the EPHA2 gene.

Function 

This gene belongs to the ephrin receptor subfamily of the protein-tyrosine kinase family. EPH and EPH-related receptors have been implicated in mediating developmental events, particularly in the nervous system. Receptors in the EPH subfamily typically have a single kinase domain and an extracellular region containing a Cys-rich domain and 2 fibronectin type III repeats. The ephrin receptors are divided into two groups based on the similarity of their extracellular domain sequences and their affinities for binding ephrin-A and ephrin-B ligands. This gene encodes a protein that binds ephrin-A ligands.

Clinical significance
It may be implicated in BRAF mutated melanomas becoming resistant to BRAF-inhibitors and MEK inhibitors. It is also the receptor by which Kaposi's sarcoma-associated herpesvirus (KSHV) enters host cells; small molecule inhibitors of EphA2 have shown some ability to block KSHV entry into human cells.

Interactions 

EPH receptor A2 has been shown to interact with:
 Ephrin_A1 
 ACP1 
 Grb2, 
 PIK3R1,  and
 SHC1.

It was also shown that doxazosin is a small molecule agonist of EPH receptor A2.

References

Further reading

External links 
 
 

Tyrosine kinase receptors